ANRC may refer to:
Alaska Native Regional Corporation
American National Red Cross
American National Riding Commission
Association of Nene River Clubs
Australian National Railways Commission
Australian National Research Council
Adithyaa Neuromuscloskeletal Rehabilitation Center